Infinity Festival Hollywood, aka Infinity Festival, is a multi-day event held annually each November in Los Angeles. The event, which brings together creative talent from Hollywood and Silicon Valley, celebrates “Story Enabled by Technology” through curated exhibitions, panels, screenings and events. The festival is supported by several Hollywood studios and leading tech companies. Infinity Festival Hollywood is held at Goya Studios and the Dream Hollywood hotel, with screenings taking place at various locations in Los Angeles.

History

2018 

Infinity Festival began in 2018 as Infinity Film Festival. The event was held in Beverly Hills, from November 1–4, 2018. The former Paley Center, at 465 North Beverly Drive, served as the festival hub, with screenings and special events held in various theaters and other locations in Beverly Hills, including the Writer’s Guild Theater. The festival included over 200 speakers and over 100 screenings including studio premieres, a Tech Lab, a Student Lab, 2 floors of exhibitions, industry networking and a fine art gallery. Festival themes included 3D, 4K, Immersive, Blockchain and Artificial Intelligence. The Student Lab was presented by Chapman University Dodge College of Film and Media Arts, The University of Texas at Austin McCombs School of Business and Moody College of Communication; Sony, Deloitte and Intel. This was also the debut of the Infinity Festival Monolith Awards, which are awarded in various categories recognizing achievements in entertainment and technology. The opening night party was held at United Talent Agency and was co-presented by CES, the Consumer Electronics Show. The 2018 Festival was attended in-person by over 2,000 people and was also seen by over 45,000 people on a Facebook Live event produced by Ridley Scott Creative Group.

2019 
The festival expanded in 2019 and moved to Hollywood. Retitled Infinity Festival Hollywood, the event took place at Goya Studios, the Dream Hotel and various theaters around Hollywood, from November 7–9, 2019. The event featured a Main Stage, an Exhibition Hall, a Student Lab, an Innovation Hub and ART+TECH, a fine art gallery. The festival continued its theme of “Story Enabled by Technology” through themes that included 5G, Artificial Intelligence, Blockchain, Immersive Technology and Wellness. Screenings were held at the Dolby Vine Theater and included original films from Disney, Netflix, Pixar and Sony. Exclusive screenings included a CLED screening of “Spider-Man: Far From Home” and “Gemini Man” in 120 FPS 3D. 
Media partners included People, Entertainment Weekly, IGN, Mashable and Los Angeles radio station KPCC. FNTECH, a California-based event production company, provided all production services for the festival. The opening night event was held on the rooftop of the Dream Hotel. The Infinity Festival Monolith Awards were once again awarded to talent in the tech and entertainment communities. The 2019 festival had over 3500 live attendees.

2020  

For 2020, due to the COVID-19 pandemic, the festival was held entirely online with an all-virtual event that was held over eight weeks. The 2020 Infinity Festival began on October 28, 2020, and ran through January 7, 2021. Original material debuted on the Wednesday and Thursday of each of the 8 consecutive weeks (with the exception of Christmas week 2020 and New Year’s week 2021.) The festival was free to attend after registration on FNvirtual, an online platform which was created specifically for the event by FNTECH. Each week’s programming was devoted entirely to one of eight themes: Remote Collaboration, Artificial Intelligence, 3D/Visual effects, Virtual Production, Immersive Experiences, Real Time Storytelling, Entertainment Content, and Wellness Tech. The programming also included ART+TECH, a fine art gallery that featured innovative new media artists including Rashad Newsome and Jam Sutton. Festival speakers included Oscar winning actress and producer Brie Larson, actor and director Joseph Gordon-Levitt, and artist Refik Anadol.

New to the festival in 2020 was a collaboration with Universal Music Group and Capitol Records’ Capitol Royale. During the festival, the Universal Music Group’s Innovation Team hosted a five-week Lifestyle Innovation Challenge, where four teams were challenged to develop a detailed vision for a consumer product. The teams then hosted their final projects in the Virtual Capitol Tower, which provided a 360 navigable version of the iconic Capitol Records tower in Hollywood. The 2020 festival was attended by over 10,000 online visitors and had over 700,000 page views.

2021 
The Infinity Festival Hollywood continued in 2021 with a hybrid in-person and online event. The festival was held at Goya Studios and the Dream Hotel from November 2–4, 2021. The event featured all new programming focused on current trends including the Metaverse, AI, XR, OTT, Film, Television, Audio, Animation, Music, 5G, Art and Gaming.

New sponsors in 2021 included data centers Equinix and CoreSite, and entertainment production solutions experts Cast & Crew. Featured guests at the festival included comedian/producer Howie Mandel, actor/producer Joseph Gordon-Levitt, composer/musician A.R.Rahman, political commentator and author Doug Schoen, musician/artist Dave Navarro, TikTok star Gabby Murray, social media influencers Dytto and Justmaiko, and producer/writer/directors Phil Lord and Chris Miller, who conducted a panel about their Sony Pictures Animation blockbuster hit “The Mitchells vs. the Machines”, which was soon after nominated for an Academy Award for Best Animated Feature.
 
The fine art gallery, ART+TECH, was sponsored by The Immersive Van Gogh Exhibit Los Angeles and Lighthouse Immersive. The gallery featured artists working in traditional and new mediums, and included an installation called “NFT’s – The Journey of a Collector”, a comprehensive story on the role of NFT’s in today’s art world. ART+TECH opening night attendees were offered a private viewing of the Van Gogh Exhibit, which was held at the Lighthouse Immersive space adjacent to Goya Studios. Infinity Festival Hollywood was commended by the City of Los Angeles for its exceptional contribution to the people, helping to make the city a better place to work, live and thrive.

2022 

Infinity Festival Hollywood continued for its fifth year with a live event that took place on November 2-5, 2022 at Goya Studios and the Dream Hotel. Festival programming continued with a focus on the latest content production trends impacting Hollywood and the tech industries. Tracks and themes for the show included a focus on Virtual Production, Web3 technologies for media and entertainment, and creators and their partnerships with tech companies. The main stage featured an overview of these trends with Hollywood executives and talent sharing their insights. Howie Mandel joined the show for a second year demonstrating Proto, a holoportation solution. The festival's Chief Curator, Lori H. Schwartz, lead a conversation with Oscar, BAFTA, and Grammy Award winning composer A.R. Rahman and Intel's Ravi Velhal on the impact technology had on the storytelling for Rahman's VR directorial debut, "Le Musk." Featured guests at the festival also included actor/environmentalist/entrepreneur Ian Somerhalder on the Metaverse, actor Jeff Bridges launching an NFT, actor Jon Heder talking about his partnership with Verified Labs to launch his "The Order of the Tigons" NFT collection and Elijah Allan-Blitz discussing his groundbreaking AR short film "Remembering" on Disney+ starring Brie Larson.

A new event for 2022 was a Virtual Production Workshop, conducted for a full day, which featured sessions on the virtual art department, on-set operations, and shooting and directing, all with a focus on the pipeline. Other highlights included a Web3 case study summit, a track dedicated to creatives, and panels featuring various celebrities whose connection to technology elevated their experiences. The festival also featured an exhibition hall, showcasing the latest innovations from Z by HP, Qualcomm, Proto and others, and also featured a Student Lab. The ART+TECH fine art gallery included the works of prominent new media and fine artists, including Carlos Luna James, Teek Mach, Giuseppe Lo Schiavo and Marilyn Minter. A popular activation was Be_Yond, a collaborative interactive installation by Londubh Studio's Brynn Gelbard & Lisa Donohoe and the Polish software house Nomtek. Also new in 2022 was the So. Cal Women's Summit, sponsored by MESA and Women in Technology Hollywood. Sustainability was a theme throughout the show and the summit kicked off their event with an opening keynote "Future Women in Tech Wear Green."

Special events for 2022 included a VIP opening night party on the rooftop of the Aster, a special screening of the film "Signs of Life" at the Griffith Observatory with an intro by noted astronomer and Director of the Griffith Observatory, Dr. Ed Krupp. The festival also featured the US debut of A.R. Rahman's "Le Musk", the first feature-length VR cinematic sensory experience.

Infinity Festival 2022 was presented by Z by HP, NVIDIA and XLA, and co-presented by Snapdragon. Presenting media sponsors were The Wall Street Journal, OUTFRONT Media and media sponsor was IGN. The Virtual Production Workshop was sponsored by Z by HP, NVIDIA, ETC at USC, and Roe Creative Display. Event production was provided by Paladin Creative, Piddle Pops and Known Events Group.

Festival sponsors 
The festival has had a variety of different sponsors over the years. In 2018 the title sponsor was Verizon’s RYOT Studio; presenting sponsors were Epic Games and Unreal Engine, co-presenting sponsor was D-Box Technologies. Festival sponsors included Intel, ILMxLAB, Sotheby’s, Real D and The Third Floor, Inc. Verizon’s RYOT Studios returned as title sponsor for the 2019 event. Presenting sponsor was Mastercard, and co-presenting sponsor was Z by HP. Producer sponsors included Amazon Web Services, Qualcomm, Dolby, Intel, Lenovo and The Third Floor. Presenting media sponsors were Los Angeles Times and Outfront Media. The 2020 festival was presented by Z by HP Inc. and Microsoft and was co-presented by Unity Technologies. The presenting media partner was OUTFRONT Media, executive producer was Intel and producer sponsors were Essentia Water and Phase Two. The 2021 Infinity Festival Hollywood title sponsors were Z by HP Inc. and NVIDIA, presenting and gaming sponsor was Unity Technologies, executive producers were Microsoft, Qualcomm and CoreSite, and producer was Intel. Infinity Festival 2022 was presented by Z by HP, NVIDIA and XLA, and co-presented by Snapdragon. Presenting media sponsors were The Wall Street Journal and OUTFRONT Media. Evening event sponsors were Intel, Lighthouse Immersive, The Aster, and The Griffith Observatory. Executive producer sponsors were Microsoft, Verizon, Paramount, Equinix, Barco, Cinionic and Powster. Producer sponsors were Avid Technology, JSF Financial, RSL and Company, USC Annenberg, Phase Two and Versatile Media. Research partners were Liz Huszarik and SmithGeiger, and the Student Lab was sponsored by The University of Texas at Austin Texas Immersive Institute, Carnegie Mellon University, and the Johnny Carson Center for Emerging Media Arts at the University of Nebraska- Lincoln.

Monolith Awards 

These are a group of awards given out to outstanding achievements in technology and narrative arts. A panel of judges, at the top of their respective fields, dictate who the awards are given to. These awards made their first appearance at the 2018 festival and will return in 2023. Past Monolith Award winners include cutting edge projects created by Qualcomm, Adobe, NVIDIA, DreamWorks Animation, Sony Pictures VR, Unreal Engine, Ziva Dynamics, National Geographic and RYOT Studios.

References 



Film festivals in Los Angeles
Festivals established in 2018
Events affected by the COVID-19 pandemic